Apatelodes velutina is a moth in the family Apatelodidae. It is found in Brazil (São Paulo).

References

Natural History Museum Lepidoptera generic names catalog

Apatelodidae
Moths described in 1895